Toledo, Belize, may refer to:
Toledo District
Toledo Settlement, a town in Toledo District